Revaz Imnaishvili (born 9 August, 1997) is a Georgian water polo player for WPC Dinamo Tbilisi and the captain of Georgian national water polo team. 

Previously he has played for water polo teams of Szeged (Hungary), KVP Novaky (slovakia), and Rari Nantes Sori (Italy).

He participated at the 2016 - 2018 - 2020 Men's European Water Polo Championships.

References

1997 births
Living people
Male water polo players from Georgia (country)
Expatriate water polo players
Expatriate sportspeople from Georgia (country) in Italy